Matinabad (also Romanized as Matīnābād) is a village in Khaledabad Rural District, Emamzadeh District, Natanz County, Isfahan Province, Iran. At the 2006 census, its population was 547, in 137 families.

References 

Populated places in Natanz County